Danko Cvjetićanin (often credited as Cvjetičanin; born 16 October 1963) is a Croatian basketball scout and former player.

Cvjetićanin won two silver medals at the Olympic Games, one with Yugoslavia (1988) and the other with Croatia (1992). Cvjetićanin, who started his career with Partizan, won the European Club Championship with Cibona in 1986. He also played professionally in Spain and Italy.

Early life
Born in Zagreb, six-year-old Cvjetićanin moved to the Yugoslav capital Belgrade along with his parents and sister when his sociologist father Vladimir Cvjetićanin, whose areas of study primarily focused on the social structure of the Yugoslav population, took a management position at the state-owned Ivo Lola Ribar metallurgical factory in the Belgrade suburb of Železnik.

Growing up during the 1970s in Belgrade, Cvjetićanin attended the Drinka Pavlović Primary School. Being a tall yet mobile kid, he soon took up basketball in the OKK Beograd youth categories before transferring to KK Partizan. While playing youth basketball in the late 1970s, teenage Cvjetićanin idolized two Yugoslav basketball stars with body type and skill set similar to his own—Dragan Kićanović and Mirza Delibašić.

Club playing career

KK Partizan
Cvjetićanin began his basketball career with KK Partizan.

KK Cibona
In 1985, right before his 22nd birthday, Cvjetićanin moved to KK Cibona, reigning European Champions Cup and Yugoslav League champion. His transfer was precipitated by his parents moving back to Zagreb.

Post-playing career
After playing career, Cvjetićanin worked as the European scouting coordinator for the NBA's Philadelphia 76ers from 1998 to 2010. He has been performing the same position for the New Jersey Nets since 2010.

Personal life
Cvjetićanin's son Filip (born 1993) played college basketball for the Florida Gulf Coast University.

He is married to Marga Cvjetićanin, they have two children Lana Cvjetićanin born in 2014 and Tin Cvjetićanin born in 2016.

References

External links
 Danko Cvjetićanin at ACB.com
 

1963 births
Living people
Basketball players at the 1988 Summer Olympics
Basketball players at the 1992 Summer Olympics
Brooklyn Nets scouts
CB Estudiantes players
Croatian basketball scouts
Croatian expatriate basketball people in Italy
Croatian expatriate basketball people in Spain
Croatian expatriate basketball people in Serbia
Croatian expatriate basketball people in the United States
Croatian men's basketball players
KK Cibona players
KK Partizan players
KK Zrinjevac players
Liga ACB players
Medalists at the 1988 Summer Olympics
Medalists at the 1992 Summer Olympics
National Basketball Association scouts from Europe
Olympic basketball players of Croatia
Olympic basketball players of Yugoslavia
Olympic silver medalists for Croatia
Olympic silver medalists for Yugoslavia
Pallacanestro Reggiana players
Philadelphia 76ers scouts
Serbs of Croatia
Shooting guards
Basketball players from Zagreb
1986 FIBA World Championship players
1994 FIBA World Championship players